was a Japanese director, screenwriter and producer. A co-founder of Studio Ghibli, he earned international critical acclaim for his work as a director of Japanese animated feature films. Born in Ujiyamada, Mie Prefecture, Takahata joined Toei Animation after graduating from the University of Tokyo in 1959. He worked as an assistant director, holding various positions over the years and collaborating with colleague Hayao Miyazaki, eventually directing his own film, The Great Adventure of Horus, Prince of the Sun (1968). He continued his partnership with Miyazaki, and under Nippon Animation directed the television series Heidi, Girl of the Alps (1974), 3000 Leagues in Search of Mother (1976), and Anne of Green Gables (1979). Takahata, Miyazaki and others formed Studio Ghibli in 1985, where he would direct Grave of the Fireflies (1988), Only Yesterday (1991), Pom Poko (1994), and My Neighbors the Yamadas (1999). His last film as director was The Tale of the Princess Kaguya (2013), which was nominated for an Oscar in the category of Best Animated Feature Film at the 87th Academy Awards.

Life and career

Early career
Takahata was born in Ujiyamada (now Ise), Mie Prefecture, Japan, on October 29, 1935, as the youngest of seven siblings and third son in the family. His father, Asajirō Takahata (1888–1984), was a junior high school principal, who became the education chief of Okayama prefecture after the war. On June 29, 1945, when Takahata was nine years old, he and his family survived a major United States air raid on Okayama City.

Takahata graduated from the University of Tokyo in 1959 with a degree in French literature. During this time at the school, he had seen the French film Le Roi et l'Oiseau (The King and the Mockingbird), which led him to become interested in animation. Takahata was more interested in animation as a medium, and wanted to write and direct for animated works rather than create animations himself. A friend suggested he apply for a directing job at Toei Animation; Takahata passed their entrance exam, and was hired as an assistant director for several of Toei's animated television shows and films—including Wolf Boy Ken, on which he was mentored by Yasuo Ōtsuka. Ōtsuka eventually asked Takahata to direct an animated feature film of his own; his directorial debut was The Great Adventure of Horus, Prince of the Sun (1968). Ōtsuka served as Animation Director on the film, while another Toei employee, Hayao Miyazaki, served as key animator. Though it would later be recognized as one of the first defining works of modern Japanese animation, the film was a commercial failure, and Takahata was demoted.

Unable to further improve his standing at Toei, Takahata left the studio in 1971, along with Miyazaki and Yōichi Kotabe. Takahata and Miyazaki came up with the idea of creating an animated feature film based on the stories of Pippi Longstocking. They developed the idea along with "A Production", an animated studio formed by another former Toei animator, Daikichiro Kusube (the company became Shin-Ei Animation). Takahata and Miyazaki had developed a number of storyboards and had flown out to Sweden for location shots, to meet with the books' author, Astrid Lindgren, and secure the rights for the character. However they could not reach an agreement with the rightsholders, and were forced to drop the project. Takahata and Miyazaki remained collaborators in several other animation projects through the 1970s, including taking over production of the anime series Lupin III at Ōtsuka's request, due to its poor ratings. They also made Panda! Go, Panda! for TMS around this time, which utilized some of the designs and concepts developed for the Longstocking project.

Not long afterward, Takahata, Kotabe, and Miyazaki were approached by the studio Zuiyo Enterprise to create an animated series based on the novel Heidi, which resulted in Heidi, Girl of the Alps (this also incorporated some of their work from the Pippi Longstocking concept). The animation production section of Zuiyo was established as a subsidiary company named Zuiyo Eizo, later becoming Nippon Animation, which Takahata and Miyazaki joined. Takahata continued to work at Nippon for about a decade; his work there included a World Masterpiece Theater adaptation of Anne of Green Gables in 1979, another project which had thematic similarities with the Pippi Longstocking concept.

Around 1981, Takahata left Nippon to join Telecom Animation Film Co., Ltd. (a subsidiary of Tokyo Movie Shinsha or TMS Entertainment), where he led production of an animated feature based on the manga Jarinko Chie, and a subsequent television spinoff. Around 1982, Telecom came up with the idea of an animated feature film Little Nemo: Adventures in Slumberland which adapted the Little Nemo comic, which was to feature joint direction between Japanese and American animation techniques. While both Takahata and Miyazaki were originally involved, they opted to leave the project and Telecom itself due to discord between the Japanese and American project directions.

Studio Ghibli
Concurrent to these events, Miyazaki had made his own directorial debut in the Lupin III feature film The Castle of Cagliostro in 1979, which was a critical success. Inspired by this, Miyazaki then began developing his own manga, Nausicaä of the Valley of the Wind, and directing its 1984 film adaption, which also was commercially and critically successful. Miyazaki approached Takahata with the idea of co-founding their own animation studio based on the success of Nausicaä; Studio Ghibli was subsequently formed in 1985 by Miyazaki, Takahata, and Miyazaki's collaborators Toshio Suzuki and Yasuyoshi Tokuma.

The studio primarily released animated feature films that were directed by Miyazaki, with Takahata serving as producer or in other roles. Takahata did direct several Studio Ghibli films as well. His first, Grave of the Fireflies, released in 1988, was based on the semi-autobiographical short story of the same name written by Akiyuki Nosaka, but Takahata was also partially inspired by his own experiences from the bombing of Okayama City. Grave of the Fireflies received critical acclaim for its emotional impact and anti-war themes, and is considered the film that established the international esteem of Studio Ghibli. Other Ghibli films which Takahata served as director included Only Yesterday (1991), Pom Poko (1994) and My Neighbors the Yamadas (1999). In addition to directing and producing, he also served as music director for Miyazaki's Kiki's Delivery Service (1989).

Later life and death 
Takahata announced that he would direct one last film for Studio Ghibli, The Tale of the Princess Kaguya (Kaguya-hime no Monogatari, 2013), around the same time that Miyazaki also announced his plans to retire from the studio. "Someday we should make a Japanese Heidi", Takahata and Miyazaki had both agreed after making Heidi noting its similarities to the Princess Kaguya story. Heidi's carefree depiction, Takahata had told one journalist, "stems from my ideal image of what a child should be like". When the film arrived in Western markets the following year, it was nominated for the Best Animated Feature at the 87th Academy Awards. Takahata continued to work at Ghibli, serving as an artistic producer for The Red Turtle (2016), the first feature film of Dutch animator and director Michaël Dudok de Wit in collaboration with Ghibli. The film premiered in September 2016.

Takahata had been diagnosed with lung cancer, and died on April 5, 2018, at a hospital in Tokyo, at the age of 82. On May 15, 2018, a farewell ceremony for Takahata was held at the Ghibli Museum in Tokyo. Hayao Miyazaki publicly spoke for the first time about Takahata's death, saying "I was convinced that Paku-san [Takahata's nickname] would live to be 95 years old, but he unfortunately passed away. It makes me think my time is also limited...Thank you, Paku-san."

Influences and style
Takahata was influenced by the works of Paul Grimault, a French animator, as well as French New Wave directors, including Jean-Luc Godard. He was also influenced by French-born Canadian director Frédéric Back, including his works Crac and The Man Who Planted Trees. He felt it was important to be able to achieve trompe-l'œil, the illusion of three dimensions using a two-dimensional medium.

Takahata's films had a major influence on Hayao Miyazaki, prompting animator Yasuo Ōtsuka to suggest that Miyazaki learned his sense of social responsibility from Takahata and that without him, Miyazaki would probably have been interested in comic book material. As with Miyazaki, Takahata and Michel Ocelot were great admirers of each other's work. Ocelot names Takahata's Grave of the Fireflies and Pom Poko among his favorite films.

TV works

Filmography

References

Further reading

External links
 Takahata information at nausicaa.net
 GhibliWorld.com: a Personal Conversation with Isao Takahata
 
 
 Isao Takahata anime at Media Arts Database 

1935 births
2018 deaths
Anime directors
Deaths from lung cancer in Japan
Fantasy film directors
Japanese animators
Japanese film directors
People from Ise, Mie
Recipients of the Medal with Purple Ribbon
Studio Ghibli people
Topcraft
Toei Animation
University of Tokyo alumni
World Masterpiece Theater series